Diyadin is a town in Ağrı Province of Turkey, at the foot of Mount Tendürek, a high peak in the Aladağlar range that stands between Ağrı and the north shore of Lake Van. It is the seat of Diyadin District. Its population is 20,302 (2021).

Politics 
The mayor is Betül Yaşar (HDP).

Economy

As of 1920, the area was known for its sulphur production.

Places of interest 
The Meya caves
The hot-springs
Church

References

External links
 Diyadin 

 
Kurdish settlements in Turkey